South Carolina Highway 522 (SC 522) is a  primary state highway in the U.S. state of South Carolina. It serves to connect communities in central Lancaster County.

Route description
SC 522 is a two-lane rural highway, from Liberty Hill to the North Carolina state line, near Sapps Crossroads. It is similar to a Farm-to-market road that it provides no real destination for travelers, but does provides access to farmland in central Lancaster County.

History
Originally established in either 1937 or 1938, it was a new primary route from U.S. Route 521 (US 521) near Heath Springs to North Carolina Highway 9 in Primus. In 1948, it was decommissioned. However, in 1949, it was reestablished along the same route and north to the North Carolina state line.  In 1951 or 1952, SC 522 was extended east to its current eastern terminus in Liberty Hill.

Major intersections

See also

References

External links

 
 SC 522 at Virginia Highways' South Carolina Highways Annex

522
Transportation in Kershaw County, South Carolina
Transportation in Lancaster County, South Carolina